The 2011 U.S. Men's Clay Court Championships was a men's tennis tournament played on outdoor clay courts. It was the 43rd edition of the U.S. Men's Clay Court Championships, and was an ATP World Tour 250 event. It took place at River Oaks Country Club in Houston, Texas, United States, from April 4 through April 10, 2011. Unseeded Ryan Sweeting, who entered the main draw on a wildcard, won the singles title.

Finals

Singles

 Ryan Sweeting defeated  Kei Nishikori, 6–4, 7–6(7–3)
 It was Sweeting's only singles title of his career.

Doubles

 Bob Bryan /  Mike Bryan defeated  John Isner /  Sam Querrey, 6–7(4-7), 6–2, [10–5]

Entrants

Seeds

Rankings and seedings are as of March 21, 2011.

Other entrants
The following players received wildcards into the main draw:
  James Blake
  Ryan Harrison
  Ryan Sweeting

The following players received entry via qualifying:

  Franko Škugor 
  Ivo Karlović
  Tim Smyczek
  Paul Capdeville

Withdrawals
  Kevin Anderson
  Juan Ignacio Chela (personal reasons)
  Lleyton Hewitt (foot surgery)
  Denis Istomin

References

External links
 Official website

 
U.S. Men's Clay Court Championships
U.S. Men's Clay Court Championships
U.S. Men's Clay Court Championships
U.S. Men's Clay Court Championships